Donald Edmund Rigazio (born July 3, 1934) is a former American ice hockey goaltender who was a member of the silver medal-winning United States team in ice hockey at the 1956 Winter Olympics.

Rigazio played for the United States men's national ice hockey team for three seasons, from 1954 to 1958. He was named best goaltender of the 1955 World Ice Hockey Championships. Rigazio then turned professional, playing 61 games in the IHL with the Indianapolis Chiefs and Louisville Rebels during the 1958–59 season, and winning the James Norris Memorial Trophy as the IHL's goaltender with the fewest goals allowed during the regular season.

Rigazio also played three games in the American Hockey League with the Cleveland Barons during the 1959–60 AHL season.

References

External links

1934 births
American men's ice hockey goaltenders
Ice hockey players from Massachusetts
Cleveland Barons (1937–1973) players
Indianapolis Chiefs players
Living people
Louisville Rebels players
Olympic ice hockey players of the United States
Olympic medalists in ice hockey
Medalists at the 1956 Winter Olympics
Ice hockey players at the 1956 Winter Olympics